Fernanda Villagrán Verdaguer (born 12 August 1997) is a Chilean field hockey player.

Villagran has represented Chile at both senior and junior levels, making her debut for both teams in 2016.

In 2016, Villagran represented the Chile national junior team at the 2016 Junior World Cup, scoring two goals in the tournament. Chile finished in 11th place at the tournament.

Villagran was also part of the Chile team at the 2017 Pan American Cup. At the tournament, Chile recorded a historic 4–3 victory over the United States, entering the final for the first time.

Villagran last represented Chile in a 2018 test series against the United States in Lancaster, United States.

References

1997 births
Living people
Chilean female field hockey players
Pan American Games competitors for Chile
Field hockey players at the 2019 Pan American Games
Competitors at the 2022 South American Games
South American Games gold medalists for Chile
South American Games medalists in field hockey
20th-century Chilean women
21st-century Chilean women